BizNasty Does BC is a Canadian web series created by Pasha Eshghi and Paul Bissonnette. It follows Bissonnette across the province of British Columbia as he explores it alongside 17 past and present NHL stars.

The series was acquired by Barstool Sports and released on May 14, 2018. The series has been credited with showing a lighter side of NHL players that is often hidden from the public eye.

Cast 
Paul Bissonnette as himself
Sam Reinhart as himself
Morgan Rielly as himself
Shane Doan as himself
Brendan Gallagher as himself
Shea Weber as himself
Seth Jones as himself
Tyson Barrie as himself
Connor McDavid as himself
Scottie Upshall as himself
Erik Gudbranson as himself
Jason Garrison as himself

References

External links
 Official IMDB

Canadian comedy web series
Mockumentaries